Philoscaphus is a genus of beetles in the family Carabidae, containing the following species:

 Philoscaphus barnardi W. J. MacLeay, 1888
 Philoscaphus bicostatus Sloane, 1905
 Philoscaphus carinatus (W. J. MacLeay, 1864)
 Philoscaphus costalis W. J. MacLeay, 1873
 Philoscaphus mastersii W. J. MacLeay, 1871
 Philoscaphus tuberculatus (W. J. MacLeay, 1863)

References

Scaritinae